Anna Cabana (born Anna Bitton on 6 August 1979 in Montpellier) is a French journalist and writer.

Biography

Journalism 
Cabana started her career as a political journalist at the weekly Marianne under the leadership of her mentor . She spent five years there between 2002 and 2007.

Following that, she became international correspondent at Le Point. On 11 February 2010, she received the Louis Hachette prize for her article "Sarkozy-Villepin, histoire secrète d'une haine" (Sarkozy-Villepin, secret history of a hate), which appeared in Le Point on 10 September 2009.

In August 2016, she joined the editorial board of Le Journal du Dimanche as the chief political editor.

Since 2013, she has been part of the editorial team of BFM TV.

Since January 2011, she has, at the same time, been a columnist at Le Télégramme in Brest. She writes an opinion piece each week for this publication called "Les Carnets d'Anna Cabana".

Since September 2017, she also hosts a daily TV programme on I24 News, called "Conversations avec Anna Cabana".

Literary career 
She is an author of five essays on public and political figures. These have included works about Dominique de Villepin, Alain Juppé, François Hollande, Ségolène Royal, and Valérie Trierweiler.

In 2008, she published Cécilia (under the name of Anna Bitton) about Cécilia Attias. Attias initiated legal proceedings to stop the publication of the book, but was dismissed by the courts.

She is a member of the jury for the Prix du livre politique, which is awarded each year to the best publication of a political theme.

Personal life 
She is Jewish, and since 2009 has been married to Yves Cabana, who is the son of politician . In 2020, the magazine Voici announced that she was in a relationship with Jean-Michel Blanquer.

Publications

References

1979 births
Living people
Political journalists
French women journalists
People from Montpellier
French Jews